The following list includes notable people who were born or have lived in Bloomington, Illinois. For a similar list organized alphabetically by last name, see the category page People from Bloomington, Illinois.

Academics and writing

Business and engineering

Media and arts

Fictional

Military

Politics

Sports

Baseball

Basketball

Football

Volleyball

Australian football

References

Bloomington
Bloomington